CSI: Hard Evidence is a computer and Xbox 360 game based on the CSI: Crime Scene Investigation television series. This is the fifth CSI game released, including CSI: Miami.

As with the previous CSI games, there are five cases to work on. However, the game includes improvements on CSI: 3 Dimensions of Murder, like a 3D crime scene kit. The voice of Sara Sidle is again performed by a soundalike (Kate Savage) and not Jorja Fox. Catherine Willows is also replaced by a soundalike in this game, with Edie Mirman standing in for Marg Helgenberger.

This is Telltale's first console game which was released inline with the PC version. It is Telltale's first Xbox 360 and Wii game. A Mac OS X version was later released by TransGaming, using their Cider technology.

The Cases

Case 1: Burning For You 
In the first case, a taxi driver, Bob Castor, has been killed in an apparent arson attack inside his car. The player works with Nick Stokes in this case.

During the investigation, the victim was found to be a racist with a criminal record. The details narrow down the suspects to Ed Danville, a homeless man from Arizona, Liz Sunderland, an aspiring artist whom Ed had a one-night stand with, and Debra Finch, Liz's lesbian lover and the victim's old high school prom date, who'd been harassed by him for two weeks. It is eventually revealed that Ed killed Bob because of his racist attitude towards the women, which Ed would not tolerate.

Case 2: Double Down
Waitress Connie Roth is repeatedly stabbed in her house and survives but doesn't know who hurt her. The player works with Catherine Willows in this case. Connie's boyfriend Shane, also the owner of the casino where Connie worked, is initially suspected after the woman is found to have entered into a contract with an aging African-American tycoon to be the surrogate mother for his son. However, after discovering that the husband was oblivious of the arrangement, the only suspects are the tycoon and his trophy wife. It turns out the wife attacked Connie because she was pregnant as well, but she was carrying a girl and her husband wanted a boy, causing her to fear Connie would steal him away. This case can also be played as the sixth case of the PlayStation 2 version of 3 Dimensions of Murder.

Case 3: Shock Rock 
The bodies of four members of a rock band called Bullet Train are found electrocuted. The player works with Warrick Brown in this case.

The band members each have a record, except for the young singer. The suspects are the band's roadie/sound-tech, who was picked on by the band, his current lover, who is the band's second choice for a singer, the band's hateful manager, and Bullet Train's ex-singer, who was also the ex-wife of the lead guitar player. The evidence eventually reveals the roadie's lover seduced him into killing the band so she could take over as the lead singer.

Case 4: In Your Eyes 
An eye surgeon originally from India was brutally killed in his own home. The only witness is his blind wife. After realizing the wife's alibi has holes in it, she becomes a suspect along with the victim's daughter and his partner at work, whom the victim was forcing his daughter to marry. The player works with Greg Sanders in this case. The wife turns out to be the murderer because both she and her daughter were suffering from her husband's constant attempts to control them both.

Case 5: The Peacemaker 
There has been a gun shootout where many bullets have been found, and a store clerk is shot repeatedly. A man named Keith, found at the scene of the crime admits to killing the clerk, but evidence soon suggests the work of his brothers, all three of whom are triplets. The case includes characters from the "Shock Rock" case. The player works with Gil Grissom in this case. It's revealed the triplets' mother was having an affair with the victim and despite Keith's warnings, his brothers confronted him, but he only opened fire on them. Keith's brothers took cover behind a gun case which reflected the sun's glare and blinded them, so they tried to shoot out the glass in order to see better but wound up killing the victim by accident, and Keith covered for them.

Reception 

CSI: Hard Evidence was met with mixed reception from critics, with reviewers citing repetitive gameplay and a lack of challenge as the main areas of weakness. It was also pointed out that little attention was given to implementing interesting achievements for the Xbox 360 version. GameRankings and Metacritic gave the game a score of 69% and 63 out of 100 for the PC version; 44% and 48 out of 100 for the X360 version; and 52% and 49 out of 100 for the Wii version.

References

External links 
 
 

2007 video games
Adventure games
Hard Evidence
MacOS games
Telltale Games games
Ubisoft games
Video games developed in the United States
Video games set in the Las Vegas Valley
Wii games
Windows games
Xbox 360 games
Detective video games
Video games about police officers